Bicsérd is a village in Baranya county, Hungary.

External links 
 Local statistics 

Populated places in Baranya County